Nikola Ćaćić (born 7 December 1990) is a Serbian professional tennis player. He has a career-high ranking of World No. 35 in doubles achieved on 8 November 2021. He has won three doubles titles in the ATP Tour, four doubles titles in the ATP Challenger Tour, as well as five singles and 32 doubles titles in ITF Futures tournaments.

Tennis career

2010–2014: Top 300 in singles 
Ćaćić competed both in singles and doubles events, mainly on ITF Men's Circuit and ATP Challenger Tour level. 

Having played alongside his compatriots, including Marko Djokovic, Ilija Bozoljac and Dušan Lajović, he has also taken part in three ATP World Tour main doubles tournaments held in Belgrade (in 2010 and 2012) and Umag (in 2012), where he lost in the opening rounds.

In the summer of 2014, after a series of successful appearances in Challenger tournaments played on a clay surface, and thanks to his first victory in three years in a Futures event, Ćaćić moved into the top 300 and achieved his career-high ATP singles ranking of No. 281.

2015
Ćaćić did not participate in any tournament during the 2015 season due to injury, which caused a drop from both world singles and doubles rankings.

2016
He recorded his first win on ATP World Tour level in the first round of Croatia Open, where he defeated Aljaž Bedene in three sets, ranked 69th at the time.

2019: First doubles title and Top 100 debut, Serbian No. 1 in doubles
In the summer of 2019, he won his first ATP Challenger title at the Shkymkent Challenger with Yang Tsung-hua. 

Later that year he won his first ATP tour level doubles title, alongside his compatriot Dušan Lajović at the Chengdu Open, edging out the No. 4 seeds, Jonathan Erlich and Fabrice Martin, 7–6(11–9), 3–6, [10–3]. As a result, he reached the top 100 on 30 September 2019.

2020: Inaugural ATP Cup champion, Second doubles title
In January, he was part of Serbian team that won inaugural 2020 ATP Cup by defeating Spain in the final. 

In February, he won his second ATP Tour title in Lyon, partnering Mate Pavić.

2021: Third doubles title, French Open quarterfinal, Three more finals, top 35
He partnered with Tomislav Brkić and won the doubles title at the ATP Buenos Aires, which was only their second tournament as a team. After that they reached the finals of Andalucía Open and semifinals at Serbia Open. Following these great result he entered the top 50 in doubles at a career-high ATP doubles ranking of No. 48, on 26 April 2021.

The pair also reached the quarterfinals of the 2021 French Open for their best showing in their careers defeating fourth seeds Marcel Granollers/Horacio Zeballos and Máximo González/Simone Bolelli en route.

On 8 November 2021, Cacic reached a career high of World No. 35 in doubles.

2022: Masters 1000 quarterfinal 
He reached the quarterfinals at the 2022 Mutua Madrid Open with partner Brkic where they lost to eventual champions and seventh seeded pair of Wesley Koolhof and Neal Skupski.

2023: Australian Open third round 
Partnering Aisam-ul-Haq Qureshi he reached the third round at the 2023 Australian Open where they lost to top seeds Wesley Koolhof and Neal Skupski.

Performance timelines

Doubles

Mixed Doubles

ATP career finals

Doubles: 6 (3 titles, 3 runner-ups)

Team competition finals: 1 (1–0)

Challenger and Futures finals

Singles: 10 (5 titles, 5 runner-ups)

Doubles: 57 (37 titles, 21 runner-ups)

See also
Serbia Davis Cup team
List of Serbia Davis Cup team representatives
Sport in Serbia

Notes

References

External links

 
 
 

1990 births
Living people
Serbian male tennis players
Sportspeople from Banja Luka
Serbs of Bosnia and Herzegovina